The 2015 Michelin Ginetta GT4 Supercup is a multi-event, one make GT motor racing championship held across England and Scotland. The championship features a mix of professional motor racing teams and privately funded drivers, competing in Ginetta G55s that conform to the technical regulations for the championship. It forms part of the extensive program of support categories built up around the BTCC centrepiece. It is the fifth Ginetta GT4 Supercup, having rebranded from the Ginetta G50 Cup, which ran between 2008 and 2010. The season commenced on 4 April at Brands Hatch – on the circuit's Indy configuration – and concludes on 11 October at the same venue, utilising the Grand Prix circuit, after twenty-seven races held at ten meetings, all in support of the 2015 British Touring Car Championship season.

Teams and drivers

Race calendar and results

Championship standings

Drivers' championships

Notes
A driver's best 25 scores counted towards the championship, with any other points being discarded.

References

External links
 

Ginetta GT4 Supercup
Ginetta GT4 Supercup seasons